The 2002 WUSA Founders Cup, also known as Founders Cup II, was the second championship match in Women's United Soccer Association history, played between the Carolina Courage and the Washington Freedom to decide the champion of the league's inaugural season. The game was played at  Herndon Stadium in Atlanta, Georgia on August 24, 2002. The Carolina Courage defeated the Freedom 3–2.

Pre-match
Ticket prices for the final started at $15 and were also available at $30 and $45, with a discount for group purchases. The game was broadcast live to a national audience of over 90 million households via PAX TV in the United States and several other countries.

Match

References

2002 Women's United Soccer Association season